Rocambole is a French drama created by Jean-Pierre Decourt based on the novel of the same name by Ponson du Terrail.

References

External links

1964 French television series debuts
1965 French television series endings
Television shows based on French novels
French-language television shows
Period television series